Manfred Klein (born 22 August 1947 in Berlin) is a competition rower and Olympic champion for West Germany.

Klein coxed the eight which won the gold medal at the 1988 Summer Olympics in Seoul. He received a bronze medal in 1992.

References

External links
 

1947 births
Living people
Rowers from Berlin
Olympic rowers of West Germany
Olympic rowers of Germany
Rowers at the 1972 Summer Olympics
Rowers at the 1984 Summer Olympics
Rowers at the 1988 Summer Olympics
Rowers at the 1992 Summer Olympics
Olympic gold medalists for West Germany
Olympic bronze medalists for Germany
Coxswains (rowing)
Olympic medalists in rowing
West German male rowers
German male rowers
Medalists at the 1992 Summer Olympics
Medalists at the 1988 Summer Olympics
World Rowing Championships medalists for West Germany
World Rowing Championships medalists for Germany
20th-century German people